Terrin is a surname. Notable people with the surname include:

Alessandro Terrin (born 1985), Italian swimmer
Gianfranco Terrin (born 1985), Italian film and stage actor 
Peter Terrin (born 1968), Belgian writer
Richard Terrin (1890–1958), American lawyer, military theorist, and historian